Kpélé is a prefecture located in the Plateaux Region of Togo.

Canton (administrative divisions) of Kpélé include Kpélé-Akata, Kpélé-Goudévé, Kpélé-Kamè, Kpélé-Nord, Kpélé-Novivé, Kpélé-Govié, Kpélé-Dawlotu, Kpélé-Gbalédzé, and Kpélé-Dutoè.

References 

Prefectures of Togo